Sonja Kesselschläger (born 20 January 1978, in Finsterwalde) is a German heptathlete.

International competitions

Circuit performances
Hypo-Meeting
2000 (14th), 2001 (9th), 2002 (4th), 2003 (3rd), 2004 (9th), 2005 (8th), 2006, (10th), 2008 (14th)

References
 Official Homepage
 

1978 births
Living people
People from Finsterwalde
People from Bezirk Cottbus
German heptathletes
Sportspeople from Brandenburg
Olympic athletes of Germany
Athletes (track and field) at the 2004 Summer Olympics
Athletes (track and field) at the 2008 Summer Olympics
World Athletics Championships athletes for Germany
Universiade medalists in athletics (track and field)
Universiade bronze medalists for Germany
Medalists at the 2001 Summer Universiade
20th-century German women
21st-century German women